Brigadier Nigel Aylwin-Foster is a British ex-soldier, once commander of the 2nd Royal Tank Regiment.

Publications
 Changing the Army for Counterinsurgency Operations.  (2005) Military Review, November–December, pp. 2–15

Royal Tank Regiment officers
Living people
Year of birth missing (living people)
Place of birth missing (living people)